Elbow Room  may refer to:

Literature
 Elbow Room (Dennett book), a 1984 book by Daniel Dennett
 Elbow Room (short story collection), a 1977 book by James Alan McPherson
 Elbow Room, an 1804 pamphlet by Thomas Gilliland
 Elbow Room, a 1939 poetry collection by Oliver St. John Gogarty

Music
 Elbow Room, a 2005 album by Chris Murphy
 Elbow Room, a 2005 album by Vincent Gardner
 "Elbow Room", a song by John Abercrombie and Ralph Towner from Sargasso Sea

Other uses
 "Elbow Room", an episode of Schoolhouse Rock!
 The Elbow Room, a nightclub in Birmingham, England
 Elbow Room (theatre company), an Australian theatre company that has collaborated with Eryn Jean Norvill

See also
 Elbo Room, a bar in Fort Lauderdale, Florida, US
 Lebensraum, a German expansionary concept